Salo Township is a township in Aitkin County, Minnesota, United States. The population was 102 as of the 2010 census.

Etymology
Established by Finnish settlers, Salo Township was named after Salo, Finland.

Geography

Lakes
 Dutch Lake
 Rice Lake (south edge)
 Sandabacka Lake

Adjacent townships
 Clark Township (north)
 Lakeview Township, Carlton County (northeast)
 Automba Township, Carlton County (east)
 Split Rock Township, Carlton County (southeast)
 Beaver Township (south)
 Rice River Township (southwest)
 Spalding Township (west)

Cemeteries
The township contains the following cemeteries: Finnish Apostolic and Salo.

Demographics
As of the census of 2000, there were 119 people, 48 households, and 30 families residing in the township. The population density was 3.4 people per square mile (1.3/km). There were 91 housing units at an average density of 2.6/sq mi (1.0/km). The racial makeup of the township was 100% White, 0% African American and 0% Asian. Hispanic or Latino of any race were 0% of the population.

There were 48 households, out of which 18.8% had children under the age of 18 living with them, 47.9% were married couples living together, 8.3% had a female householder with no husband present, and 37.5% were non-families. 33.3% of all households were made up of individuals, and 12.5% had someone living alone who was 65 years of age or older. The average household size was 2.48 and the average family size was 3.20.

In the township the population was spread out, with 19.3% under the age of 18, 7.6% from 18 to 24, 22.7% from 25 to 44, 33.6% from 45 to 64, and 16.8% who were 65 years of age or older. The median age was 46 years. For every 100 females, there were 112.5 males. For every 100 females age 18 and over, there were 123.3 males.

The median income for a household in the township was $23,542, and the median income for a family was $27,500. Males had a median income of $40,417 versus $0 for females. The per capita income for the township was $16,047. There were no families and 5.4% of the population living below the poverty line, including no under eighteens and 10.0% of those over 64.

References
 United States National Atlas
 United States Census Bureau 2007 TIGER/Line Shapefiles
 United States Board on Geographic Names (GNIS)

Townships in Aitkin County, Minnesota
Townships in Minnesota